The Lukang Rimao Hang is a historic building in Lukang Township, Changhua County, Taiwan.

History
The Lukang Rimao Hang was built in 1784 by Lin Zhensong who came from Fujian and settled in Lukang in 1765 as a merchant. In 1788, Lin returned to Fujian and decided to retire there, handing the management of Rimao Hang to his third son Lin Wenjun. In 1816, the building was renovated.

See also
 List of tourist attractions in Taiwan

References

1784 establishments in Taiwan
Buildings and structures in Changhua County
Tourist attractions in Changhua County